Reijonen is a Finnish surname. Notable people with the surname include:

Minna Reijonen (born 1972), Finnish politician
Seppo Reijonen (born 1944), Finnish ski jumper

Finnish-language surnames